Platyptilia nussi is a moth of the family Pterophoroidea. It is found on Luzon in the Philippines.

The wingspan is about 19 mm. Adults are on wing in November.

References

nussi
Endemic fauna of the Philippines
Fauna of Luzon
Moths described in 2003